Ascanio Piccolomini (1596–1671) was the archbishop of Siena from 1629 to 1671.

Ascanio was a mathematics pupil of Bonaventura Cavalieri. He hosted Galileo in Siena. According to Dava Sobel, Galileo's ability "to rise from the ashes of his condemnation by the Inquisition" and complete perhaps his most influential book, the Two New Sciences, was "due in large measure to Piccolomini's solicitous kindness".

He was an elder brother of the Imperial general Ottavio Piccolomini. 

While bishop, he was the principal co-consecrator of Carlo Fabrizio Giustiniani, Bishop of Accia and Mariana (1656).

Notes and references

Sources

Suter, Rufus (1965). "A Note on the Identity of Ascanio Piccolomini, Galileo's Host at Siena," Isis Vol. 56, No. 4 (Winter, 1965), p. 452.

1596 births
1671 deaths
People from Siena
Archbishops of Siena
Bishops in Tuscany
Ascanio II
17th-century Italian Roman Catholic archbishops